High Fantasy is a 2017 South African comedy film directed by Jenna Bass. It was screened in the Discovery section at the 2017 Toronto International Film Festival.

Plot 
A group of young friends on a camping trip, deep in the South African countryside wake up to discover they have all swapped bodies. Their individual cultural heritage and experience of these strange happenings couldn't be more different; and stranded in the wilderness, they will have to navigate a personal-political labyrinth if their friendship and their lives are ever to be the same again.

Cast
 Qondiswa James as Xoli
 Nala Khumalo as Thami
 Francesca Varrie Michel as Lexi
 Liza Scholtz as Tatiana

Reception
On review aggregator website Rotten Tomatoes, the film holds an approval rating of 75% based on 12 reviews, and an average rating of 5.5/10.

References

External links
 

2017 films
2017 comedy films
South African comedy films
Afrikaans-language films